

References

S
South Dakota
.Snakes
Snakes